Negalasa is a monotypic snout moth genus (family Pyralidae). Its one species, Negalasa fumalis, is found in the US state of Arizona. Both the genus and species were described by William Barnes and James Halliday McDunnough in 1913 in the same paper. 

The wingspan is about 19 mm.

Subspecies
Negalasa fumalis fumalis
Negalasa fumalis rubralis Barnes & McDunnough, 1913

References

External links
 Includes images.

Chrysauginae
Moths described in 1913
Monotypic moth genera
Moths of North America
Pyralidae genera